Delta Sigma Pi (officially the  International Fraternity of Delta Sigma Pi, Inc.) is a coeducational professional business fraternity and one of the largest in the United States. Delta Sigma Pi was founded on November 7, 1907, at the School of Commerce, Accounts and Finance of New York University (NYU) in New York, New York and is currently headquartered in Oxford, Ohio. The Fraternity has 224 active collegiate chapters, 7 colonies, 57 active alumni chapters, and 300,000 initiated members.

History
Its founders were:
 Alexander F. Makay
 H. Albert Tienken
 Harold V. Jacobs
 Alfred Moysello

Purpose
Delta Sigma Pi was established to foster the study of business at the university level. Its goals include: 
 to encourage social activity among business students, 
 to build relationships with the commercial world, 
 to promote strong ethical standards, and 
 to enhance the civic and commercial welfare of the community.

Expansion
The second chapter was founded at Northwestern School of Commerce. National meetings, called the Grand Chapter Congress, became a regular tradition and to this day the national fraternity meets every other year to conduct business and elect its national leaders.

After rapid expansion in the early 1920s, the fraternity opened its national headquarters in Chicago, Illinois. In 1957, the central office moved to Oxford, Ohio adjacent to the campus of Miami University.

The biggest change in the history of the Fraternity took place in 1975, as the Board of Directors mandated that chapters were allowed to initiate female business students, to conform with Title IX.

Symbols and traditions
In 1911 the fraternity published its first newsletter, which soon would be named The Deltasig.

The official badge of Delta Sigma Pi is a skull and crossbones, superimposed on a wreath of leaves.

The official colors of Delta Sigma Pi are old gold and royal purple.

The red rose was adopted as the official flower of Deltasig at the first Board of Directors meeting in 1921. It was primarily the gift given to the wives and courted women of Deltasig brothers (which at the time was still all male). One of the founding members, Harold V. Jacobs, suggested a rose as the official fraternity flower because his wife loved roses and it was also her first name (Rose Jacobs). Five years later, in 1926, Jacobs also suggested that the song currently sung at LEAD schools and Grand Chapter Congress events, Rose of Deltasig be adopted as the official song of the fraternity.

The Central Office
Delta Sigma Pi's national administrative headquarters was established in Chicago, Illinois, in 1924. In the fall of 1956, it moved to 330 South Campus Avenue in Oxford, Ohio (near Cincinnati and adjacent to the Miami University campus). In 1970, the original building nearly doubled in size with the addition of wings on either side of the building. Later in 2010 extensive renovations, including a courtyard featuring engraved bricks, were completed to make the building more functional and accessible. The Executive Director manages day-to-day functions of the Central Office and leads a full-time staff.

Chapters

Collegiate chapters

Since its inception in 1907, Delta Sigma Pi has installed 298 chapters, of which 224 are currently active. In addition to these chapters, Delta Sigma Pi currently has active colonies at 7 universities.

The organization is distinctly separate from U.S. social fraternities with similar names, including Delta Sigma Phi and Sigma Pi.

Alumni chapters

Delta Sigma Pi has 57 franchised Alumni Chapters on its roll for the 2018-2019 year in the United States, and over 40 more locations worldwide have Brothers with an interest in starting a new Alumni Chapter.

See also
 Professional fraternities and sororities

 Professional Fraternity Association

References

 
Professional fraternities and sororities in the United States
Student organizations established in 1907
Professional Fraternity Association
1907 establishments in New York City